Ian Antonio Alvarez (born July 14, 1978), better known by his stage name Bunji Garlin, is a Trinidadian ragga soca artist. He is also affectionately known as the Viking of Soca. His spouse is Fay-Ann Lyons.

Early life 
Bunji was born on July 14, 1978, in Arima, Trinidad. He is of Saint Lucian and Venezuelan descent.

Personal life 
He married fellow soca artist Fay-Ann Lyons on December 23, 2006, daughter of successful soca singer Superblue. He is also a second cousin of singer Patrice Roberts, who performs alongside the popular Machel Montano.

Career
Bunji has won Trinidad's Soca Monarch/International Soca Monarch competition on several occasions: 2002 (tied with Iwer George) with "Down in the Ghetto", 2004 with "Warrior Cry", 2005 with "Blaze the Fire" Both songs were produced by then band member Shawn Noel (Da Ma$tamind) and 2008 with "Fiery"  He placed second in the International Soca Monarch 2009 with "Clear De Road", while his pregnant wife Fay-Ann Lyons placed first with "Meet Super Blue". She also won the Groovy Soca Monarch title that same night with "Heavy T Bumpa".

Bunji Garlin's "Brrt" is featured on the Grand Theft Auto IV soundtrack.

In 2013, Garlin won the Soul Train Award for Best International Performance for the song "Differentology", which features Nigel Rojas on guitar. An album of the same name was released by RCA Records and VP Records in August 2014.

In 2017 he released Turn Up, which gave him his highest US chart placing to date, reaching no. 3 on the Billboard Reggae Albums chart.

Discography

Albums
The Chronicles (1999)
Revelation (2002)
Black Spaniard (2003)
Graceful Vengeance (2004)
Flame Storm (2005)
Next Direction (2006)
Global (2007)
Fiery (2008)
"iSpaniard" (2012)
The Viking  (2013)
Differentology (2014), VP/RCA - US Reggae no. 6
Turn Up (2017), VP - US Reggae no. 3

Singles
 "Differentology" (2013)
 "Truck On D Road" (2014) (featuring A$AP Ferg)
 "The Message" (2015) (featuring Damian Marley)
 "Television" (2016)

Collaborations 
 "Carnival Tabanca"  (featuring  Tarrus Riley) 2014
 "Coofy Lie Lie" (featuring Singing Sandra) (2002)
 "Rags Don't Care" (featuring Chinese Laundry and Shurwayne Winchester) (2003)
 "Soca Bhangra" (featuring Shami) (2003)
 "Don’t Waste Water" (featuring Shurwayne Winchester) (2005)
 "The Islands" (featuring Patrice Roberts) (2005)
 "Lorraine" (featuring Explainer) (2005)
 "Move With Us"  (TSTT jingle also featuring Shurwayne Winchester and Machel Montano) (2006)
 "Get Up Stand Up" (featuring T.O.K.) (2007)
 "Hardcore Loving" (featuring Rita Jones) (2007)
 "Swing it" (featuring Chris Black) (2007)
 "One Family" (featuring Freddie McGregor) (2007)
 "Bring It" (featuring Lalchan Babwa (Hunter))  (2008)
 "Country Rum (featuring Neeshan Prabhoo)  (2008)
 "Bring It Superstar Mix" Lalchan Babwa(Hunter) ft. Alison Hinds, Andy Singh, Bunji Garlin & Ziggy Rankin (2008)
 "That's How We Party" (featuring Busy Signal) (2005)
 "Big Blood" (featuring 3suns, Sir Skarz) [2011]
 "Sex, Love and Reggae" (Gyptian ft. Bunji Garlin and Angela Hunt) (2013)
 "All or Nothing" (Elliphant ft. Diplo and Bunji Garlin)
 "Jungle Bae" (Jack Ü ft. Bunji Garlin) (2015)
 "Baddest Things" (Party Favor & Nymz ft. Bunji Garlin) (2015)
 "Buss Head" (Machel Montano) (2017)
 "Ride it" (Sebastian Ingrosso & Salvatore Ganacci ft. Bunji Garlin) (2017)
 “Famalay” (Bunji Garlin, Machel Montano, Skinny Fabulous) (2019)
 "Bomboclat (Light It Up)" (Dillon Francis, Bunji Garlin) from the EP Magic Is Real (2019)
 “Break a branch” (Bunji Garlin, Motto) (2020)

References

External links

1978 births
Living people
Soca musicians
Trinidad and Tobago people of Saint Lucian descent
Trinidad and Tobago people of Venezuelan descent
People from Arima
20th-century Trinidad and Tobago musicians
21st-century Trinidad and Tobago musicians
VP Records artists
RCA Records artists